Alyan may refer to:

Places
Alian (disambiguation), places in Iran
Sikachi-Alyan, a village in Russia

People
Murad Alyan (b. 1977), Israeli soccer player
Yousuf Saleh Alyan, Kuwaiti newspaper executive
Alyan Muhammad Ali al-Wa'eli (b. 1970), Yemeni fugitive